Ostrowąż-Kolonia  is a village in the administrative district of Gmina Ślesin, within Konin County, Greater Poland Voivodeship, in west-central Poland.

The village has a population of 79.

References

 	

Villages in Konin County